Camino Palmero is the debut studio album recorded by American alternative band the Calling. It was released by RCA Records on July 10, 2001 (see 2001 in music). It contains their hit single "Wherever You Will Go". The title of the album comes from a Los Angeles street where band members Alex Band and Aaron Kamin first met. The record has many grunge influences and also has a lot of guitar solos.

Camino Palmero peaked at number 36 on Billboard 200 and was certified Gold by Recording Industry Association of America (RIAA). The album was also certified Gold in Canada in November 2002 after sold more than 50,000 units. The album also did well on several International charts, among others it made number 12 in United Kingdom, number 16 in Italy and topped the charts in Mexico, holding 1× Diamond status plus 3× Platinum. World sales of the album are estimated at approximately 5 million. In Brazil, it has been certified Platinum by Associação Brasileira dos Produtores de Discos (ABPD).

The album deals with romantic love, relationships, break up and betrayal.

The cover art of the album represents the platforms 5 and 6 of the Santa Maria Novella railway station in Florence, Italy.

Critical reception 

Camino Palmero garnered mostly negative reviews from music critics. Johan Wippsson of Melodic saw potential in the band based on "Wherever You Will Go" and an amount of constant energy throughout the album despite generic lyrics about relationships, concluding with, "Except for that this is a very impressing debut from a group that have all the chances to be the next Lifehouse." Bob Waliszewski of Plugged In commended the album for delivering positive messages of forgiveness and self-realization but found it a little indulgent in its unsavoury delights, concluding that "Camino Palmero acknowledges God, celebrates lifelong love and speaks up for the destitute. But several cuts show bad form in their approach to women by modeling lust, bitterness and sexual immorality."

David Browne, writing for Entertainment Weekly, said that despite checking off all the requirements of arena rock he criticized Alex Band for writing songs that are self-indulgent in their tales of on-and-off again relationships, saying that "The Calling are so stiflingly earnest that their love song playing off the Who Wants to Be a Millionaire catchphrase – "Final Answer" – is dead serious." Hannah Hamilton of Hot Press panned the album for its overly simplistic musicianship and lyrics about unoriginal romances, calling it "a mild, meek, pathetic excuse for a record that goes nowhere, says nothing and charges you twenty euro for the pleasure. Guilty? Oh hell yes."

Track listing

Personnel
Credits adapted from the Camino Palmero liner notes.

The Calling
Alex Band – lead vocals
Aaron Kamin – lead guitar, backing vocals
Sean Woolstenhulme – rhythm guitar, backing vocals
Billy Mohler – bass
Nate Wood – drums, backing vocals

Additional musicians
Ron Fair – synthesizer
Bob Glaub – bass guitar
Paul Mirkovich – keyboards
Zac Rae – organ
Satnam Ramgotra – percussion, tabla

Technical
 Ron Fair – Executive Producer
 Tiago Becker – Assistant Engineer
 Marc Greene – Engineer
 Robert Hadley – Mastering
 Frank Harkins – Art Direction, Design
 Chris Lord – Mixing
 Stephen Marcussen – Mastering
 Doug Sax – Mastering
 Matt Silva – Mixing
 Marc Tanner – Producer
 David Thoener – Engineer, Mixing

Charts

Weekly charts

Year-end charts

Certifications

References 

2001 debut albums
RCA Records albums
The Calling albums